Kayla Kessinger (born November 25, 1992) is an American politician who has served in the West Virginia House of Delegates from the 32nd district since 2014.

References

1992 births
Living people
Republican Party members of the West Virginia House of Delegates
21st-century American politicians
21st-century American women politicians
Women state legislators in West Virginia
Politicians from Beckley, West Virginia